Csere is a Hungarian surname. Notable people with the surname include:
 Alexis Skyy, born Csere
 Csaba Csere, American mechanical engineer and magazine editor
 Gáspár Csere
 János Apáczai Csere (1625–1659), Hungarian polyglot and mathematician

See also
25778 Csere, outer main-belt asteroid

Hungarian-language surnames